Operación Triunfo (lit: Operation Triumph), also known as OT Chile, was a short-lived Chilean reality television programme aired on Mega from 9 June to 14 September 2003. This series was an adaptation of the Spanish television franchise Operación Triunfo. It was presented by Álvaro Escobar and the winners were Mónica Rodríguez and César Ávila.

Until 2008, 5 editions were held, but in 2018, the programme come back and until 2020, 3 editions were held

Season 1 (2003)

Contestants

References 

 
2003 Chilean television series debuts
2003 Chilean television series endings
2000s Chilean television series
Television shows set in Santiago
Chilean reality television series